Cotswold Commons and Beechwoods is a  biological Site of Special Scientific Interest in Gloucestershire, notified in 1954.

The Commons and Beechwoods lie within the Cotswold Area of Outstanding Natural Beauty. The site includes the Cotswold Commons and Beechwoods National Nature Reserve and Cooper's Hill Local Nature Reserve.  It is part registered as common land and part owned by National Trust.

The Cotswold Beechwoods are recognised as a Special Area of Conservation (SAC) under the EU Habitats Directive.

Location
The site comprises ancient Beech woodland and unimproved grassland.  It overlies Jurassic limestones and is at the western edge of the Cotswolds. It is located around the villages of Sheepscombe and Cranham, and along the top of the scarp between Painswick and Birdlip.

Species
The woodlands are diverse in their species, and the grasslands are typical of unimproved calcareous pastures well known for the area. The area supports many rare species of plants (including several varieties of orchid) and is an exceptional area for invertebrates. There are some disused limestone mines which are used as winter roosts by several bat species.

Woodland
The beechwoods are currently developed as a high forest structure, but have a long history of management for timber.

Commons
The unimproved limestone grassland is mainly the common lands at Painswick Beacon, Cranham and Sheepscombe.

Publications
 Natural England publication on 'Buckholt Wood: Cotswold Commons and Beechwoods National Nature Reserve, (NE335), July 2012

References

SSSI Source
 Natural England SSSI information on the citation
 Natural England SSSI information on the Cotswold Commons and Beechwoods units

External links

 Natural England (SSSI information)
 National Trust

Sites of Special Scientific Interest in Gloucestershire
Sites of Special Scientific Interest notified in 1954
Nature reserves in Gloucestershire
Forests and woodlands of Gloucestershire
Cotswolds